HMS Puffin (L52) (later K52), was a  sloop of the British Royal Navy, built in the 1930s, that saw service during World War II. The ship was laid down on 12 June 1935 by Alexander Stephens and Sons, based at Linthouse in Glasgow, launched on 5 May 1936, and commissioned on 6 August 1936.

Armament
On the outbreak of war, Puffin, like the rest of her class, was rapidly up-gunned. First a multiple Vickers machine gun was mounted on the quarterdeck, and two single 20 mm Oerlikon guns, added as they became available, on single pedestal mounts on the deckhouse aft, with the machine gun being replaced later with a further pair of such weapons. As it became available the Centimetric Radar Type 271 was added - a target indication set capable of picking up the conning tower or even the periscope or snorkel of a submarine. Radar Type 286 air warning was added at the masthead.

Service history
On 25 October 1939 the German submarine  was sunk in the English Channel near Dover by depth charges from Puffin and the ASW trawler HMS Cayton Wyke.

On 19 May 1940 Puffin along with a group of six trawlers and two destroyers took part in "Operation Quixote", cutting commercial cables from the UK to Europe off the  coast of Norfolk.

On 26 March 1945 Puffin under the command of Lt.Cdr. A.S. Miller, RNZNVR, rammed and sank a German Seehund midget submarine off Lowestoft. The impact caused the U-boat's torpedoes to explode and Puffin was so badly damaged that she was written off as constructive total loss, and finally sold for scrapping in 1947.

References

Bibliography
 

 
 

 

Kingfisher-class sloops
Ships built on the River Clyde
1936 ships
Maritime incidents in March 1945